Ślemień  is a village in Żywiec County, Silesian Voivodeship, in a mountainous part of southern Poland. It is the seat of the gmina (administrative district) called Gmina Ślemień.

The village has a population of 1,977 (2013).

References

Villages in Żywiec County